Vicky Donor is a 2012 Indian Hindi-language romantic comedy film directed by Shoojit Sircar and produced by actor John Abraham in his maiden production venture with Sunil Lulla under Eros International and Ronnie Lahiri under Rising Sun Films. The film stars debutants Ayushmann Khurrana and Yami Gautam, with Annu Kapoor and Dolly Ahluwalia in pivotal roles. The concept is set against the background of sperm donation and infertility within a Bengali-Punjabi household. 

Vicky Donor was released on April 20, 2012 at around 750 screens in India. The film opened to universal critical acclaim and performed strongly at the box office. It became a commercial success grossing 66.32 crore worldwide, against a budget of 15 crore.

At the 60th National Film Awards, Vicky Donor won the National Film Award for Best Popular Film Providing Wholesome Entertainment. At the 58th Filmfare Awards, it received 8 nominations, including Best Film, Best Director (Sircar), Best Supporting Actress (Ahluwalia) and Best Female Debut (Gautam), and won 4 awards, including Best Supporting Actor (Kapoor) and Best Male Debut (Khurrana). 

The film was remade in Telugu as Naruda Donoruda (2016) and in Tamil as Dharala Prabhu (2020).

Plot
Dr. Baldev Chaddha is a fertility expert who runs a clinic and a sperm bank in Daryaganj, Delhi that guarantees high-quality sperm for couples. Unfortunately, he has more failed cases than successes. He is on the lookout for a healthy and high-performing donor.

Vicky Arora hails from an Arora Punjabi family and is the only son of his widowed mother Dolly, who runs a small beauty parlour in Lajpat Nagar. They live with their grandmother. Vicky is a vagabond who provides no financial support to the household and starts searching for a job that will provide them with a better lifestyle.

Chaddha meets Vicky and likes his happy-go-lucky nature. He believes Vicky is the donor he has been looking for. He stalks him and eventually painstakingly convinces him to become a sperm donor. Though Vicky is hesitant at first, he accepts after receiving a high salary. He hides his career after facing ridicule from his friends, but starts spending wildly, renovating his house and the parlour.

Vicky meets an ambitious accountant Ashima Roy at the bank and they fall in love after going out a number of times. They soon wish to get married, but as a divorced Bengali bank employee wanting to marry a carefree man from a loud Punjabi family, the couple faces backlash from their families eventually managing to get their approval. Vicky continues to hide his occupation, and stops donating sperm after getting married, ignoring Chaddha who continues to chase Vicky as he is his most successful donor.

In an ironic turn, the couple discovers Ashima is infertile. They wish to get both of them tested, but Vicky cannot take the fertility test and is forced to admit to being a sperm donor. Taken aback by her husband's strange career, Ashima leaves for her paternal home. Vicky is heartbroken and cuts all ties with Chaddha.

The parlour is soon raided by income tax officers due to their frivolous renovations. Vicky is arrested on suspicion of handling black money but is bailed out by Dr. Chaddha, who reveals his occupation to his family members. Vicky's mother is disgusted and also apologises to Ashima. Vicky's grandmother and Ashima's father make them understand how Vicky's deed has helped many families bear children and ask them to have a progressive take on this.

Chaddha calls Vicky and Ashima to an event he has hosted where all families that Vicky helped bear children are present, and helps Ashima see how his step helped them find happiness. He then tells them that one child is absent. This little girl has lost her parents in an accident. Her grandparents failed to contact Chaddha's clinic and had to send her to orphanage. Dr. Chaddha suggest the couple adopt little girl. Ashima begins to see reason and understands. The couple reunites, adopts the little girl, and Vicky continues to occasionally donate sperm for Chaddha's clinic.

Cast

Themes and development
Vicky Donor deals with sperm donation and infertility. When questioned about the risky subject matter, Abraham responded, "Basically, Vicky Donor is a romantic comedy. But the concept is set against the background of sperm donation." Abraham hoped that the film could shed light on a serious issue still considered "taboo" in Indian society.

Sircar said, "I want to take a light-hearted look at the taboo attached to infertility and artificial insemination." Before filming began, Sircar researched the plot themes for three years. Juhi Chaturvedi, creative director at advertising agency Bates, who wrote the screenplay based on her own idea, had stayed in Lajpat Nagar as a student at College of Arts, Delhi. As the script went through several drafts, she met a couple who run a noted fertility clinic in Mumbai.

Production
Despite the usual trend, Abraham did not take up the leading role in the film: "It was a conscious decision to not act in my first production because I believe producing a film is about creating quality content that I believe in." Director Sircar suggested Khurrana, a video jockey and television host, for the role of Vicky; he was considered because he was popular among the youth. He "can read and write Punjabi too." Khurrana turned down three film projects to play the lead in Vicky Donor. To prepare for the role, he met medical experts and donors to understand sperm donation; a major medical consultant specializing in the field was later inducted as a medical adviser for the film. Additionally, Khurrana studied acting and attended workshops with N.K. Sharma in Delhi. It was later reported that Abraham would perform an "item number." Commenting on his performance, Abraham said "I am glad I cast Ayushmann in the lead. He's a complete natural, has all the trappings of a fine actor and has delivered a super performance. It doesn't seem like Vicky Donor is his first film." It was reported that the production crew would feature "the best technicians from Los Angeles" and acclaimed action choreographer J J Perry. Incidentally, Ayushmann who plays the lead role, successfully performed a task on the reality show MTV Roadies: Season 2, which was sperm donation.

Soundtrack 

The soundtrack album features eight tracks which were composed by Abhishek-Akshay, Bann, Rochak Kohli and Ayushmann Khurrana. All of them contributed two tracks each. Actor Khurrana also composed and sung the track "Pani Da Rang" which was released as a single on 1 February 2012. The song was well received by music listeners. The song has a female version composed by Khurrana, and it was sung by Sukanya Purkayastha. The entire album released by Eros Music on 29 February 2012.

The soundtrack album received positive reviews from critics. IBNlive.in says "Vicky Donor album tracks are worth listening and contain rawness." Ayushmann Khurrana won the Filmfare Award for Best Male Playback Singer at 58th Filmfare Awards for "Pani Da Rang."

Track listing

Reception

Critical reception
Vicky Donor received critical acclaim upon release. Blessy Chettiar of DNA India rated the film with 4/5 and said, "Run to the nearest theatre and surrender yourself to charm of Vicky and his team. This "Aryaputra" provides only good quality entertainment." Madhureeta Mukherjee of The Times of India gave Vicky Donor 3.5 out of 5 and said, "It takes a man to make a film like this, literally. Kudos to John Abraham for his brave maiden production. Thankfully, this sperm hits bullseye." Mathures Paul of The Statesman gave the film 3.5/5 and wrote, "Vicky Donor is an admirable movie that is at once simple, emotional, daring and in your face."

Box office

India
The film had an opening at the box office worldwide and collected  on its first day in India. Vicky Donor showed good growth on Saturday as all India collections jumped around 35%–40%; it collected around  nett taking its two-day business to  nett. The film got tough competition from Housefull 2 in its first week of theatrical run in India. Vicky Donor is the 3rd small-budget film of 2012 after Paan Singh Tomar and Kahaani to receive such an acceptance by critics, multiplex goers and urban audience. It grossed  nett on Sunday. Vicky Donor had a decent three-day weekend as it grossed around  nett over its first weekend.

It had a good first week of around  nett. Vicky Donor had an excellent second week collecting around  nett taking its two-week total to around  nett. Vicky Donor continued its strong run into the third week and totally grossed .

Overseas
The film had a wide release with close to 125 prints and grossed a decent $350,000 overseas in four days. It has done well in North America and decently in other markets.

Grosses are as follow:

 UK: £90,329 ($140,600)
 USA: $466,467
 UAE: $286,000
 Australia: $88,682

Total: $1.2 million (65 million)

Accolades

Sequel and remakes
After the major critical and commercial success of the film, producer John Abraham announced that he was encouraged by the response of Vicky Donor and has therefore laid a sequel on the cards. The sequel titled "Vicky Pet Se" is about a man getting pregnant. However, the story was similar to 2022 film Mister Mummy starring Riteish Deshmukh

Dileep has bought the remake rights for the Malayalam version. Telugu director Madhura Sreedhar bought the remake rights of the film for the Telugu version named Naruda Donoruda starring Sumanth. It was remade in Tamil as Dharala Prabhu starring Harish Kalyan.

References

External links
 
 
 

2012 films
Films set in Delhi
Films about sperm donation
Indian remakes of foreign films
2012 romantic comedy films
Indian romantic comedy films
Films directed by Shoojit Sircar
Hindi films remade in other languages
Films featuring a Best Supporting Actor National Film Award-winning performance
Films featuring a Best Supporting Actress National Film Award-winning performance
Best Popular Film Providing Wholesome Entertainment National Film Award winners